Slančík is a village and municipality in Košice-okolie District in the Kosice Region of eastern Slovakia.

History
In historical records the village was first mentioned in 1270 (Terra Zalanch), when it belonged to Slanec Castle. In 1330 it passed to local Lord Wilhelm Drugeth, and after to noble landowners Losonczy and Forgách.

Geography
The village lies at an altitude of 300 metres and covers an area of 3.308 km². The municipality has a population of 225 people.

External links
http://www.statistics.sk/mosmis/eng/run.html

Villages and municipalities in Košice-okolie District